Ibrahim Benjamin Traoré (born 16 September 1988) is an Ivorian professional footballer who plays as a midfielder for Slavia Prague in the Fortuna Liga.

Club career
Traoré began his career with Ivorian clubs CO Korhogo and AS Tanda, before signing for Al-Ahly Benghazi of the Libyan Premier League in 2013. In 2014, he moved to Táborsko in the Czech National Football League, the second tier of football in the Czech Republic. After a break-out season in the 2015–16 Czech National Football League, he moved to the top league side Zlín in September 2016. 

On 3 September 2018, Slavia Prague announced that they had signed Traoré on loan, with an obligation to buy.

In January 2019, Traoré signed a contract with Slavia Prague for an undisclosed fee.

International career 
In November 2019, he received his first international call up from the Ivory Coast national team, aged 31.

Career statistics

References

External links 
 
 
 

1988 births
Living people
Footballers from Abidjan
Ivorian footballers
Association football midfielders
Ivory Coast international footballers
AS Tanda players
Al-Ahly SC (Benghazi) players
Czech First League players
FC Fastav Zlín players
FC Silon Táborsko players
SK Slavia Prague players
Ivorian expatriate footballers
Expatriate footballers in the Czech Republic
Ivorian expatriate sportspeople in the Czech Republic
Czech National Football League players
Libyan Premier League players